Olga Tzavara (21 November 1924 - 25 June 2013) was a Greek sport shooter who won five individual gold medals at senior level at the European Championships from 1958 to 1962. She was considered the "grande dame" of Greek shooting and a pioneer in women's shooting.

See also
 Trap and double trap European Champions

References

External links
 

1924 births
2013 deaths
Trap and double trap shooters
Greek female sport shooters
Sportspeople from Athens
20th-century Greek women